The Three Eldest Children of Charles I is an oil painting on canvas by Anthony van Dyck, produced between November 1635 and March 1636 and still in the Royal Collection. Numerous studio copies were made of this painting.

It shows Charles II, Mary and James II, the three eldest children of Charles I and his wife Henrietta Maria of France, with two King Charles spaniels.

Background 

In 1635 Van Dyck had painted a portrait of the same three children, which was intended to be sent to Queen's sister Christina, in exchange for portraits of the Duchess's children. However, the King was angry with Van Dyck for showing Prince Charles wearing skirts, worn only by younger children, so the artist painted a second group portrait of the same three children, this time with  Prince Charles wearing pants.

Derivative works
Numerous studio copies were made of this painting, including copies now in Dresden and Wilton House.

References

Portraits by Anthony van Dyck
Paintings in the Royal Collection of the United Kingdom
1635 paintings
1636 paintings
Charles II of England
James II of England
Paintings of children
Oil on canvas paintings